Celine van Duijn (born 4 November 1992) is a Dutch diver. She competed in the women's 10 m platform event at the 2018 European Aquatics Championships, winning the gold medal.

Van Duijn competed at the 2013, 2015 and 2017 World Aquatics Championships. At the 2018 FINA Diving World Cup she finished 4th together with Inge Jansen at the women's Synchronised 3m Springboard event.

References

External links
 
 

1992 births
Living people
Dutch female divers
Sportspeople from Amersfoort
European Championships (multi-sport event) gold medalists
Olympic divers of the Netherlands
Divers at the 2020 Summer Olympics
21st-century Dutch women